Megachile phaseoli is a species of bee in the family Megachilidae. It was described by Moure in 1977.

References

Phaseoli
Insects described in 1977